C.S.I.R - Institute of Himalayan Bioresource Technology or CSIR-IHBT established in 1983 is a constituent laboratory of Council of Scientific and Industrial Research. This institute located in Palampur, Kangra, Himachal Pradesh, India is engaged in various advanced research aspects of Himalayan Bio-resources and modern biology. It has also been imparting Ph.D. in Biological and Chemical Sciences.

Situated among pristine environ in the lap of Dhauladhar ranges, CSIR-IHBT is the only laboratory of the Council of Scientific and Industrial Research in the State of Himachal Pradesh (H.P.), India. Institute has a focused research mandate on bioresources for catalysizing bioeconomy in a sustainable manner.

The institute has state-of the art laboratories; remote sensing and mapping facilities; internationally recognised herbarium; animal house facility; pilot plants in nutraceuticals, essential oil and herbals; farms and polyhouses. The young and dynamic team of scientists propel the research and work dedicatedly to discover and find solutions to new challenging problems faced by the society. International collaborations further strengthens scientific interactions at a global scale. Promoting industrial growth through technological interventions is a constant endeavour and several technologies developed by the institute are transferred to industries. For socio- economic upliftment,  regular training programmes and  advisory services are rendered to farmers,  floriculturists, tea planters and small entrepreneurs involved in food processing sector. Institute has been recognised as one of the Incubation Centres by MSME  GoI and in the area of Affordable Health Care by DSIR. Institute encourages industries to share the technological problems faced them, such that efforts could be made in developing a viable solution. Confidentiality is strictly maintained. Institute fosters student-scientist interaction and school children are welcome to visit the institute. Post graduate students can do project and sharpen their research skills at CSIR-IHBT. Young researchers are welcome for to do Ph.D. in cutting edge areas under the able guidance of expert faculty. Institute passionately contribute its bit in the development of society, industry and environment.

References

Biotechnology
Council of Scientific and Industrial Research
Research institutes in Himachal Pradesh
Education in Kangra district
1983 establishments in Himachal Pradesh
Research institutes established in 1983